Lola Harvey was a British screenwriter and film actress. She and her husband Syd Courtenay were employed by British International Pictures, the leading British film studio of the era, to write screenplays together. Their work provided a number of scripts for the popular comedian Leslie Fuller.

Selected filmography

Screenwriter
 Old Soldiers Never Die (1931)
 Doctor's Orders (1934)
 Lost in the Legion (1934)

References

Bibliography
 Harper, Sue. Women in British Cinema: Mad, Bad and Dangerous to Know. A&C Black 2000.

External links

Year of birth unknown
Year of death unknown
British film actresses
British screenwriters

British women screenwriters